Oakwood is a historic farm property west of Warrenton in rural Fauquier County, Virginia.  It is bounded on the south by Old Waterloo Road, and on the west by Great Run, a south-flowing tributary of the Rappahannock River.  The main house is a rambling two-story masonry building, whose oldest portions date to the 18th century.  Its present appearance has significant Greek Revival features, include a gabled temple-front portico added about 1838.  The property is also notable in local culture for hosting the very first Virginia Gold Cup race in 1922.

The property was listed on the National Register of Historic Places in 2016.

See also
National Register of Historic Places listings in Fauquier County, Virginia

References

Houses on the National Register of Historic Places in Virginia
Colonial Revival architecture in Virginia
Houses completed in 1838
Houses in Fauquier County, Virginia
National Register of Historic Places in Fauquier County, Virginia